Cabinet of Tadeusz Komorowski (Polish: Rząd Tadeusza Komorowskiego) was a Polish cabinet in exile headed by General Tadeusz Bór-Komorowski.

The cabinet was formed on 2 July 1947 and resigned on 10 February 1949
 Tadeusz Bór-Komorowski, Prime Minister.
 Zygmunt Berezowski (SN), Minister of Internal Affairs.
 Adam Pragier (ZPS), Minister of Information.
 Bronisław Kuśnierz (SP), Minister of Justice.
 Władysław Folkierski (SN), Minister of Religion and Public Enlightenment.
 Adam Tarnowski, Minister of Foreign Affairs.
 Gen. Marian Kukiel, Minister of National Defense.
 Stanisław Sopicki (SP), Minister of the Public Administration Reconstruction.

See also 
 Polish Government in Exile

Komorowski Tadeusz
1947 establishments in Poland
1949 disestablishments in Poland
Cabinets established in 1947
Cabinets disestablished in 1949